The Janco Dada Museum is located in Ein Hod, Israel. It is a museum that exhibits the work of Marcel Janco as well as art from the Dada movement and contemporary art too. The museum was established in 1983, by a group of Marcel Janco's friends, with the purpose of conserving the works and ideas of the sole Dadaist living in Israel.
Marcel Janco thought of Ein Hod as the right place for a museum. He conceived the idea of establishing the artists' village, and invited in the first group of founders in 1953.

References

External links
 Official site
 Ein Hod artist's village site

Art museums and galleries in Israel
Museums established in 1983
Museums in Haifa District
Biographical museums in Israel
1983 establishments in Israel